Gavij (also Romanized as Gāvīj, Gāvīch, and Gāwich; also known as Gāvoj, Kalāt-e Gāvīch, Kalateh Gavij, and Kalāteh-ye Gāvoj) is a village in Gazik Rural District, Gazik District, Darmian County, South Khorasan Province, Iran. At the 2006 census, its population was 381, in 74 families.

References 

Populated places in Darmian County